Kheyrokabad (also Romanized as Kheyrokābād; also known as Kheyrokbāzār) is a village in Polan Rural District, Polan District, Chabahar County, Sistan and Baluchestan Province, Iran. At the 2006 census, its population was 220, in 51 families.

References 

Populated places in Chabahar County